Phryganodes erebusalis is a moth in the family Crambidae. It was described by George Hampson in 1898. It is found in Equatorial Guinea and Sierra Leone.

References

Spilomelinae
Moths described in 1898